Tandil (also Romanized as Tandīl) is a village in Qaen Rural District, in the Central District of Qaen County, South Khorasan Province, Iran. At the 2006 census, its population was 24, in 9 families.

References 

Populated places in Qaen County